The 1945 season of the Primera División Peruana, the top category of Peruvian football, was played by 8 teams. The national champions were Universitario. No team was promoted or relegated.

Results

Standings

Promotion playoff

External links 
 Peru 1945 season at RSSSF
 Peruvian Football League News 

Peru1
Peruvian Primera División seasons
1